W. S. "Fluke" Holland (April 22, 1935 – September 23, 2020) was an American drummer who played with Carl Perkins, and later for Johnny Cash in the bands The Tennessee Three, The Great Eighties Eight, and The Johnny Cash Show Band.

Holland was born in Saltillo, Tennessee in April 1935 and graduated from J.B. Young High School in Bemis.

He played drums on the 1955 Sun Records recording of "Blue Suede Shoes" and performed on the "Million Dollar Quartet" session that featured Elvis Presley, Jerry Lee Lewis, Perkins, and Cash. Holland appeared with the Carl Perkins band in the 1957 rock and roll movie Jamboree, performing "Glad All Over."

In 2014, Holland was honored at the Carl Perkins Center in Jackson, Tennessee for his 60 years of musical contributions.

In 2018, Holland was honored with the "Lifetime Achievement" award during the annual Tennessee Music Awards event at the University of Memphis Lambuth in Jackson, Tennessee. He was also inducted into the Radio Nostalgi Hall of Fame in Sweden on July 3, 2016.

Holland made a cameo appearance on the History Channel program Pawn Stars, accompanying a classic car collector who was trying to sell Johnny Cash's Rolls-Royce to Rick Harrison. They did not agree on a price. 

He died at his home in Jackson, Tennessee on September 23, 2020 at the age of 85.

References

External links
 (The "Official" WS Holland web site)
 Video Interview on July 14, 2013
 

1935 births
2020 deaths
20th-century American drummers
20th-century American male musicians
American country drummers
American male drummers
Country musicians from Tennessee
People from Hardin County, Tennessee
The Tennessee Three members
The Great Eighties Eight members